Ore miners working on the Marquette Iron Range (located in the United States' Upper Peninsula of Michigan) went on strike in July 1865, shortly after the end of the American Civil War. They were put down by a naval detachment from the USS Michigan, using an improvised armored train, and later with an army detachment from Chicago.

Prelude: 1864 
During the United States' Civil War, high demand meant the price of iron had significantly increased. Knowing this, the miners forced the mining companies to raise their wages in 1864. The problem was not solved, as the dockworkers, who were paid significantly less than the miners, struck for higher wages. Cleveland Iron Mining Company officials near the capital requested troops from Michigan's governor, believing that the war's demand for iron would override social concerns for the workers. They were correct; a United States Navy gunboat, Michigan, and a troop contingent were sent to the area. Their arrival was instrumental in quashing the strike.

Strike: 1865 
The wartime demand quickly abated after the war's end in April 1865, and the many returning soldiers increased the labor pool. When combined, this meant that Cleveland and other nearby companies felt justified in announcing a wage cut on Saturday, July 1, 1865. The miners grudgingly accepted the cuts, but the dockworkers refused their wage cut and the companies gave into their demands. This galvanized the miners, and 1500 to 2000 of them marched on the mines and the town of Marquette, looting, burning, and destroying equipment they came across. Two days later, Michigan and its crew arrived in Marquette's harbor as part of a routine sweep of Lake Superior for Confederate activity.

The captain of Michigan, Lieutenant Commander Francis A. Roe, had fought through the war in various capacities, including directing a fight between his Sassacus and a Confederate ram, Albemarle. On appraising the situation, he quickly moved to end the strike. He mounted two of the ship’s guns on a railroad car, fitted it with metal to act as armor, and enlisted a steam engine to push it with a full landing party. All were armed and most were veterans of the war, as opposed to the miners, who had little to no combat experience. He recounted the incident months later:

After Michigans departure, the miners struck again and were put back down by a returning Michigan and the 8th Regiment of the Veteran Reserve Corps, brought up by rail from Chicago.

Footnotes

Endnotes

References 
Reynolds, Terry S. and Virginia P. Dawson. Iron Will: Cleveland Cliffs and the Mining of Iron Ore, 1847-2006. Detroit: Wayne State University Press, 2011.
Rodgers, Bradley A. "The Naval Suppression of Michigan’s Upper Peninsula Mining Strikes of 1865." Extract from master's thesis, East Carolina University, 1990.

Further reading 
Reynolds, Terry S. "Calm or Conflicted: Labor-Management Relations on the Michigan Iron Ranges in the Nineteenth Century." Michigan Historical Review 33, no. 2 (Fall 2007): 1–45.
Rodgers, Bradley A. Guardian of the Great Lakes: The U.S. Paddle Frigate Michigan. Ann Arbor: University of Michigan Press, 1996.
 ———. "Deliverance by Sea: Michigan’s Peninsula War of 1865." Michigan History 73, no. 6 (Nov–Dec 1989): 16–21.

 

Mining in Michigan
Upper Peninsula of Michigan
1865 in Michigan
1865 labor disputes and strikes